Events in the year 1952 in Bulgaria.

Incumbents 

 General Secretaries of the Bulgarian Communist Party: Valko Chervenkov
 Chairmen of the Council of Ministers: Valko Chervenkov

Events 

 The Bulgarian Mint was established.

Sports 

 Bulgaria competed at the 1952 Winter Olympics in Oslo, Norway.
 FC Minyor Radnevo, a Bulgarian football club from the town of Radnevo, was founded.

References 

 
1950s in Bulgaria
Years of the 20th century in Bulgaria
Bulgaria
Bulgaria